The Men's sprint was held on 20 October 2017.

Results

Qualifying
The top four riders advanced directly to the 1/8 finals; places 5 to 28 advanced to the 1/16 finals.

1/16 Finals
Winners proceed to the 1/8 finals.

1/8 Finals
Winners proceed to the quarter-finals.

Quarter-finals
One-on-one matches are extended to a 'best of three' format hereon.
Winners proceed to the semi-finals.

Semi-finals
Winners proceed to the gold medal final; losers proceed to the bronze medal final.

Finals
The final classification is determined in the medal finals.

References

Men's sprint
European Track Championships – Men's sprint